Shin Won-ho (born 19 May 2001) is a South Korean professional footballer who plays as a left-back for K League 1 club Suwon Samsung Bluewings.

Career statistics

Club
.

Notes

References

External links

Profile at Gamba Osaka

2001 births
Living people
South Korean footballers
South Korea youth international footballers
South Korean expatriate footballers
Association football defenders
J3 League players
Gamba Osaka players
Gamba Osaka U-23 players
Suwon Samsung Bluewings players
South Korean expatriate sportspeople in Japan
Expatriate footballers in Japan